Patrik Brezina (born 28 April 1976) is a Slovak football retired goalkeeper.

References

External links
 at fcvion.sk 

1976 births
Living people
Slovak footballers
Association football goalkeepers
FC Nitra players
FC ViOn Zlaté Moravce players
Slovak Super Liga players
Sportspeople from Nitra